A respirator cartridge or canister is a type of filter that removes gases, volatile organic compounds (VOCs), and other vapors from air through adsorption, absorption, or chemisorption. It is one of two basic types of filters used by air-purifying respirators. The other is a mechanical filter, which removes only particulates. Hybrid filters combine the two.

Workplace air that is polluted with fine particulate matter or noxious gases but that contains enough oxygen (in the US, this is ruled to be a concentration above 19.5%; in the Russian Federation, above 18%), can be rendered safe via air-purifying respirators. Cartridges are of different types, and must be chosen correctly and replaced on an appropriate schedule.

Purification methods

Absorption 

Capturing noxious gases may be accomplished by sorbents. These materials (activated carbon, zeolite, etc.) have a large specific surface area and can absorb many gases. Typically, such sorbents are in the form of granules, and fill the cartridge. Contaminated air travels through the cartridge's bed of sorbent granules. Movable harmful gas molecules collide with the surface of the sorbent and remain therein. The sorbent gradually saturates and loses its ability to capture pollutants. The bond strength between captured molecules and the sorbent is small, and molecules can separate from the sorbent and return to the air. The sorbent's ability to capture gases depends on the properties of the gases and their concentrations, including air temperature and relative humidity.

Chemisorption 

Chemisorption utilizes a chemical reaction between the gas and the absorber. The ability of some harmful gases to react chemically with other substances can be used to capture them. Creating strong links between gas molecules and a sorbent may allow repeated use of a canister if it has enough unsaturated sorbent. Copper salts, for example, can form complex compounds with ammonia. A mixture of copper ions (+2), zinc carbonate, and TEDA can detoxify hydrogen cyanide. By saturating activated carbon with chemicals, chemisorption can be used to help the material make stronger ties with molecules of trapped gases and improve the capture of harmful gases. Saturation of iodine improves mercury capture, saturation of metal salts improves ammonia capture, and saturation of metal oxides improves acid gas capture.

Catalytic decomposition 

Some harmful gases can be neutralized through catalytic oxidation. A hopcalite can oxidize toxic carbon monoxide (CO) into harmless carbon dioxide (CO2). The effectiveness of this catalyst strongly decreases as relative humidity increases. Therefore, desiccants are often added. Air always contains water vapor, and after saturation of the desiccant, the catalyst ceases to function.

Combined cartridges 

Combined, or multi-gas cartridges protect from harmful gases by using multiple sorbents or catalysts. An example is ASZM-TEDA Carbon used in CBRN masks by the US Army. This is a form of activated carbon saturated with copper, zinc, silver, and molybdenum compounds, as well as with triethylenediamine (TEDA).

Classification and marking  

Cartridge selection comes after assessing the atmosphere. NIOSH guides cartridge choice in the US along with manufacturer recommendations.

United States 

In the US, approval for respirator cartridge particulate filtration efficiency classification and certification is administered by the National Institute for Occupational Safety and Health (NIOSH) as part of Part 84 of Title 42 of the Code of Federal Regulations (42 CFR 84). Manufacturers can certify cartridges intended for purifying workplace air from various gaseous contaminants.

Orange can be used for painting the entire cartridge housing, or as a strip. But this color is not in the table, and determining the cartridge's protection requires reading the inscription.

Legislation requires the employer to select cartridges using only labels (not color markings).

European Union and Russia 

In the European Union (EU) and the Russian Federation (RF), manufacturers can certify cartridges intended for cleaning the air of various gaseous contaminants. The codes are covered by EN14387, additionally particulate codes P1, P2 and P3 are used. For example, A1P2 is the code for commonly used filters in industry and agriculture that provide protection against A-type gases and commonly occurring particulates.
 
Cartridges AX, SX, and NO not distinguish on the sorption capacity (as in the US) when they are classified and certified.

If the cartridge is designed to protect from several different types of harmful gases, the label will list all designations in order. For example: A2B1, color - brown and grey.

Other jurisdictions that use this style of classification include Australia/New Zealand (AS/NZS 1716:2012) and China (GB 2890:2009).

Detection of end of service life 

 Service lives of all types of cartridges are limited, therefore, the employer is obliged to replace them in a timely manner.

Old methods

Subjective reactions of users' sensory systems 

The use of cartridges in the contaminated atmosphere leads to saturation of the sorbent (or the dryer — when using catalysts). The concentration of harmful gases in the purified air gradually increases. The ingress of harmful gases in the inhaled air can lead to a reaction in a user's sensory system: odor, taste, irritation of the respiratory system, dizziness, headaches, and other health impairments up to the loss of consciousness.

These signs (known in the US as "warning properties" - p. 28) indicate that one must leave the polluted workplace area, and replace the cartridge with a new one. This can also be a symptom of a loose fit the mask to one's face and the leakage of unfiltered air through the gaps between the mask and the face. Historically, this method is the oldest.

The advantages of this method – if harmful gases have warning properties at concentrations less than 1 PEL, the replacement will be produced on time (in most cases, at least); the application of this method does not require the use of special cartridges (more expensive) and accessories; replacement happens when one needs to do it – after the sorbent saturation, and without any calculations; the sorption capacity of the cartridges is fully expired (which reduces costs for respiratory protection).

The disadvantage of this method is that some harmful gases have no warning properties. For example, there is a list of over 500 harmful gases in the Respirator Selection Guide and over 60 of them have no warning properties, and there is no such information for over 100 of them. So, if one uses warning properties to replace cartridges, this may lead to breathing air with an excess harmful gas concentration in some cases. The table contains a list of the chemicals that have no warning properties.

If the threshold odor of pentaborane is 194 PEL; and if its concentration is only 10 PEL, one cannot timely change cartridges by using smell - they could be "used" forever, but they cannot protect forever.

The practice has shown that the presence of warning properties does not always lead to timely cartridge replacement. A study showed that on average 95% of a group of people have an individual threshold of olfactory sensitivity in the range of from 1/16 to 16 from the mean. This means that 2.5% of people will not be able to smell harmful gases at a concentration 16 times greater than the average threshold of perception of a smell. The threshold of sensitivity of different people can vary by two orders of magnitude. That is, 15% of people do not smell at concentrations four times higher than the sensitivity threshold. The value of threshold smell greatly depends on how much attention people pay to it, and on their health status.

The sensitivity may be reduced, for example, due to colds and other ailments. It turns out that a worker's ability to detect smell also depends on the nature of the work to be performed—if it requires concentration, a user may not react to the smell. Prolonged exposure to harmful gases (for example, hydrogen sulfide) at low concentrations can create olfactory fatigue which reduces sensitivity. In all of these cases, users can be exposed to harmful substances with concentrations larger than 1 PEL, and it may lead to the development of occupational diseases.

This was the reason for the ban to use this method of cartridge replacement in the US since 1996 (the Occupational Safety and Health Administration  OSHA standard).

Mass increase 

To protect workers from carbon monoxide cartridges often use the catalyst hopcalite. This catalyst does not change its properties over time of use, but when it moistened, the degree of protection may be significantly reduced. Because water vapor is always present in the air, the polluted air is dehumidified in the cartridge (for use of the catalyst). Since the mass of water vapor in the polluted air is greater than the mass of harmful gases, trapping moisture from the air leads to a significantly higher increase in the mass of cartridges than the trapping gases. This is a substantial difference, and it can be used to determine whether to continue to use gas cartridges further without replacement. The cartridge is weighed, and a decision can be made based on the magnitude of increase of its mass. For example, the book describes gas cartridges (model "СО"), which were replaced after a weight gain (relative to initial) of 50 grams.

Other methods 
The documents described Soviet cartridges (model "Г"), designed to protect from mercury. Their service life was limited to 100 hours of use (cartridges without particle filter), or 60 hours of use (cartridges with particle filter), after which it was necessary to replace the cartridge with a new one.

The documents describe a non-destructive way to determine the remaining service life of new and used gas cartridges. Polluted air was pumped through the cartridge. The degree of purification of air depends on how much-unsaturated sorbent is in the cartridge, therefore, accurate measurement of gas concentration in the cleaned air allows one to estimate the amount of the unsaturated sorbent. Polluted air (1-bromobutane) was pumped for a very short time, and therefore, such tests do not reduce the service life considerably. The sorption capacity decreased due to absorption of this gas by about 0.5% of the sorption capacity of a new cartridge. The method was also used for 100% quality control of the cartridges manufactured by the English firm Martindale Protection Co. (10 microliters 1-bromobutane injected into the air stream), and to check the cartridges issued to workers in firms Waring, Ltd. and Rentokil, Ltd. This method was used in the Chemical Defence Establishment in the early 1970s. The experts who developed this method, received a patent.

The document briefly describes two methods to objectively evaluate the degree of saturation of the sorbent in the cartridges. It recommends using spectral and microchemical methods. The spectral method is based on determining the presence of harmful substances in the cartridge by sampling, with subsequent analysis on a special device (стилоскоп - on Russian). A microchemical method is based on a layer-by-layer determination of the presence of harmful substances in the sorbent by sampling with subsequent analysis by chemical method. If the air is contaminated with the most toxic substances, the book recommends to limit the further duration of cartridge use, and it recommended to apply the spectral method (arsine and phosphine, phosgene, fluorine, organochloride, organometallic compounds), and microchemical methods (hydrogen cyanide, cyanogens).

Unfortunately, in both cases, there is no description of how to extract a sample of the sorbent from the cartridge housing (the housing is usually not detachable), and use the cartridge after this test, if the test shows that it does not have a lot of saturated sorbents.

Modern methods  

Cartridge certification provides a minimum value of their sorption capacity. US OSHA standard for 1,3-Butadiene indicates the specific service life of the cartridges.

Laboratory testing 

If the company has a laboratory with the right equipment, specialists can skip the contaminated air through the cartridge and determine the degree of cleaning needed. This method enables one to determine the service life in an environment where the air is contaminated with a mixture of different substances that affect their capture with a sorbent (one affecting another capture). Service life calculation methods for such conditions have been developed relatively recently. However, this requires accurate information on concentrations of noxious substances, and they often are not permanent.

Tests in laboratories can identify the balance of service life of cartridges after their use. If the remainder is large, similar cartridges in such circumstances can be used over a longer period of time. In some cases, a large balance allows the use of cartridges repeatedly. This method does not require accurate information on the concentrations of harmful substances. The cartridge replacement schedule is drawn upon the basis of the results of their testing in the laboratory. This method has a serious drawback. The company must have complex and expensive equipment and trained professionals to use it, which is not always possible. According to a poll, cartridges replacement in the US was carried out on the basis of laboratory tests in approximately 5% of all organizations.

Research to determine whether it is possible to calculate the service life of respirator cartridges (if one know the conditions of their use) have been conducted in developed countries since the 1970s. This allows one to replace cartridges in a timely fashion without the use of sophisticated and expensive equipment.

Computer programs 

The world's leading respirator manufacturers offered customers computer programs for calculating the service life already in the year 2000.
 

3M program allowed to calculate the service life of the cartridges exposed with more than 900 harmful gases and their combinations in 2013. The MSA program enables taking into account hundreds of gases and their combinations. The same program was developed by Scott and Dragerwerk. J. Wood developed a mathematical model and software which now allows one to calculate the service life of any cartridges with known properties. Now OSHA uses it in its Advisor Genius program.

The merit of this way of replacing the cartridges is that it allows an employer to use normal, "common" cartridges, and if they have the exact data, they may replace them in time. The downside is that because of air contamination is often not constant, and the nature of the work to be performed is not always stable (that is, the flow of air through the cartridges is not permanent), it is recommended to use working conditions for calculations, equal to the worst case, for reliable protection. But in all other cases, cartridges will be replaced with a partially used sorbent. This increases the costs of respiratory protection due to more frequent cartridges replacement.

In addition, calculation accuracy is reduced under very high relative humidity, because the mathematical model does not take into account some of the physical effects in such cases.

End-of-service-life indicators 

If a cartridge has a device to warn the user of the approaching expiration of the service life (end-of-service-life indicator, ESLI), the indication can be used for timely replacement of cartridges. ESLI can be active or passive. A passive indicator often uses a sensor that changes color. This element is installed in the cartridge at some distance from the filtered air outlet so that the color change occurs before harmful gases begin to pass through the cartridge. An active indicator may use a light or an audible alarm to signal that a cartridge needs to be replaced.

Passive end-of-service-life indicators

Active indicators use light or an audible alarm for user notification that is triggered by a sensor that is usually installed in the cartridge. Such indicators allow one to replace the cartridges on time in any light and do not require the worker to pay attention to the color of the indicator. They can also be used by workers who badly distinguish different colors.

Despite the presence of solutions for technical problems, and the availability of established certification requirements to the ESLI, during the period from 1984 (first certification standard with requirements for active ESLI) until 2013 not one cartridge with active ESLI was approved in the US. It turned out that the requirements for the cartridges are not quite exact, and employers are under no requirement to use these indicators specifically. Therefore, respirator manufacturers fear commercial failure when selling new unusual products, although they continue to carry out research and development work in this area.

Active end-of-service-life indicators:

Examination of respirator use in the US showed that over 200,000 workers may be exposed to excessive harmful gases due to late replacement of cartridges. So, the Laboratory of PPE (NPPTL) at the NIOSH began to develop an active ESLI. After the completion of the work, its results will help establish clear legal requirements for employers to follow and resulting technology will be transferred to industry to use in new improved RPD.

Legal requirements 

Since it is not always possible to replace cartridges in a timely manner through the use of their odor ets, OSHA has banned the use of this method. The employer is obliged to use only two ways to replace cartridges: on schedule, and by using ESLI (because only these methods provide reliable preservation of workers’ health). OSHA instructions to inspectors provides specific guidance on inspection of implementation of such requirements. On the other hand, the state requires manufacturers to provide the consumer with all necessary information about cartridges to allow one to make a schedule for their timely replacement. Similar requirements exist in the standard on occupational safety, governing selection and application of RPD in EU. In England a tutorial on the selection and use of respirators recommends obtaining information from the manufacturer, and replacing the cartridges on a schedule or use ESLI, and prohibits reusing cartridges after exposure of volatile substances that can migrate.
 The US law required the employer to use exceptionally supplied air RPD (SAR) for protection against harmful gases that have no warning properties. The use of supplied air respirators may be the only way to reliably protect workers in circumstances when there is no ESLI, and it is impossible to calculate their service life.
 Legislation in the EU allows an employer to use only supplied air respirators when employees work in conditions where air pollution is IDLH, because of the risk of untimely cartridge replacement.

Reuse 

If the cartridge contains a lot of the sorbent and if the concentration of contaminants is low; or if the cartridge was used for a short duration of time, after completion of its use, it still has a lot of unsaturated sorbent (which can capture gases). This may allow using such cartridges again.

The molecules of an entrapped gases may de-absorb during storage of the cartridge. Due to the difference of concentrations inside the body of the cartridge (at the inlet concentration is greater; at the outlet for purified air concentration is lesser), these de-absorbed molecules migrate inside the cartridge to the outlet. The study of cartridges exposed to methyl bromide showed that this migration can impede the re-use of storage. Concentration of harmful substances in the purified air may exceed the PEL (even if clean air is pumped through the cartridge). To protect worker health, US law prohibits cartridge reuse when exposed to harmful substances that can migrate, even if the cartridge has much non-saturated sorbent after the first use. According to the standards, "volatile" substances (those able to migrate) are considered substances with a boiling point below 65 °C. But studies have shown that at the boiling point above 65 °C reuse of the cartridge may be unsafe. Therefore, the manufacturer must provide the buyer with all information required for safe cartridge use. So, if the period of continuous service life of the cartridge (calculated by the program - see above) exceeds eight hours (see tables 4 and 5), the legislation may limit their use to one shift.

The paper  provides a procedure for calculating the concentration of harmful substances in purified air at the start of cartridge reuse which allows one to determine exactly where they may be safely reused. But these scientific results are not yet reflected in any standards or guidelines on respirator use. The author of the article, working in the US, did not even try to consider the use of gas cartridges more than twice. On the author's website one can download a free computer program that allows one to calculate concentration of harmful substances immediately after the start of re-use of the cartridge (which allows one to determine if it is safe).

Regenerating gas cartridges 

Activated carbon does not bond with harmful gases strongly, so they can be released later. Other sorbents undergo chemical reactions with the hazard and form strong bonds. Special technologies have been developed for recovery of used cartridges. They created conditions that have stimulated desorption caught earlier harmful substances. This used steam or heated air in the 1930s  or other methods. Processing of the sorbent was carried out after its removal from the body of the cartridge, or without removing.

Specialists tried to use ion-exchange resin as the absorber in 1967. The authors proposed to regenerate the sorbent by washing it in a solution of alkali or soda.

The study also showed that cartridges can be effectively regenerated after exposure to methyl bromide (when they are blown with hot air 100 to 110 °C, flow rate 20 L/min, duration about 60 minutes).

Regeneration of sorbents is used consistently and systematically in the chemical industry, as it allows cost savings on the replacement of sorbent and regeneration of industrial gas cleaning devices to be carried out thoroughly and in an organized manner. However, in the mass use of gas masks under different conditions it is impossible to control the accuracy and correctness such regeneration of respirators’ cartridges. Therefore, despite the technical feasibility and commercial benefits, regeneration of respirator cartridges in such cases is not carried out.

References 

Safety equipment
Respirators